The canton of Calvisson is an administrative division of the Gard department, southern France. It was created at the French canton reorganisation which came into effect in March 2015. Its seat is in Calvisson.

It consists of the following communes:
 
Aspères
Aujargues
Boissières
Calvisson
Cannes-et-Clairan
Combas
Congénies
Crespian
Fons
Fontanès
Gajan
Junas
Lecques
Montignargues
Montmirat
Montpezat
Nages-et-Solorgues
Parignargues
La Rouvière
Saint-Bauzély
Saint-Clément
Saint-Geniès-de-Malgoirès
Saint-Mamert-du-Gard
Salinelles
Sauzet
Sommières
Souvignargues
Villevieille

References

Cantons of Gard